The General Teaching Council for Northern Ireland is the body overseeing the qualification, registration, and good conduct of teachers in Northern Ireland.

References

External links
Official site

Education in Northern Ireland
Education regulators
Teaching in the United Kingdom